KFLU-LD, virtual channel 20 and UHF digital channel 35, is a low-powered Bounce TV-affiliated television station licensed to Fort Smith, Arkansas, United States. The station is owned by DTV America Corporation of Sunrise, Florida.

History 
The Federal Communications Commission issued a construction permit for the station under the callsign of K20LU-D in 2012. The station’s callsign changed to the current KFLU-LD in 2013. station began broadcasting in 2015 as a satellite station of sister station KAJL-LD in Fayetteville, Arkansas, rebroadcasting programming of Telemundo on the main channel, and the Doctor Television Channel its the second digital subchannel.

In December 2015, the station became a separate station and became a Bounce TV affiliate, with the second subchannel becoming affiliated with Grit. DT3 and DT4 were both launched to serve as affiliates of Escape and Laff, respectively.

Later, the station began broadcasting a fifth and a sixth digital subchannel that carried the Liquidation Channel and Newsmax TV, respectively.

Digital channels

References

FLU-LD
Comet (TV network) affiliates
Decades (TV network) affiliates
Heroes & Icons affiliates
Scripps News affiliates
TBD (TV network) affiliates